Hippelates is a genus of flies in the family Chloropidae and are often referred to as eye gnats or eye flies (the name is also used for members of the Old World genus Siphunculina).

Description
They are very small ( long) flies that frequently congregate around the eyes to lap at the fluids. They are primarily a nuisance pest, and do not bite. They have been linked with the spread of bovine mastitis in North America, and in certain tropical regions, they are capable of vectoring disease-causing bacteria (e.g., yaws).

Hippelates pusio is considered to be the vector for anaplasmosis, bovine mastitis, and Haemophilus spp. which cause bacterial conjunctivitis or 'pinkeye'.

Distribution
Hippelates are Neotropical and Nearctic in distribution.

Species
 Hippelates bishoppi
 Hippelates dorsalis Loew, 1869
 Hippelates genalis Loew, 1869
 Hippelates impressus Becker, 1912
 Hippelates nobilis Loew, 1863
 Hippelates pallipes Loew, 1863
 Hippelates plebejus Loew, 1863
 Hippelates proboscideus Williston, 1896
 Hippelates pusio Loew
 Hippelates saundersi Kumm, 1936

References

External links
 Entomological Society of Washington

Insect vectors of animal pathogens
Insect vectors of human pathogens
Veterinary entomology
Chloropidae genera
Oscinellinae